Christophe Taëron (9 January 1919 – 26 July 1996) was a French racing cyclist. He rode in the 1939 Tour de France.

References

1919 births
1996 deaths
French male cyclists
Place of birth missing